Nikita Purnama Willy or better known as Nikita Willy (born in Jakarta, Indonesia on June 29, 1994) is an Indonesian actress, model and  singer of Minangkabau descent.

Career
Nikita Willy started her career as an advertising model. In 2000, she had the opportunity to star in her first soap operas titled Jin And Jun (Jin dan Jun). After that, Nikita Willy returned to playing in the soap operas Hari Potret and Ratu Malu and Jendral Kancil.

In 2003 her name became more famous and managed to steal the attention of television audiences, when she played in the soap opera entitled "Moon and Star" (Bulan dan Bintang). In addition, she received many offers to play in a number of television soap operas, such as Habibi and Habibah, Roman Picisan, Nikita, and Safa dan Marwah. she had earned the nickname "Queen of Indonesian soap operas" with the highest paid. Not only in the world of soap operas, she also played in a number of FTV and films. In addition, she also plunged into the world of singing. Some of the singles that are quite famous are Kutetap Menanti (2010) and Lebih Dari Indah (2011).

In 2012 Nikita Willy hosted the Nickelodeon Indonesia Kids Choice Awards and in 2014 she became a director and worked on 2 TV Movie entitled Romeo dan Juliet Dipinggir Kali and Pacar Sewaan

Nikita Willy trained in mixed martial arts and fitness in the United States. In the United States Nikita Willy became a mixed martial artist, bodybuilder, and fitness model while Nikita Willy trained in the UFC.

On her lavish 17th birthday party in 2011, she was given a new Cadillac with a value of Rp.3.4 billion (~US$374,000) as a present from her parents. Keith Martin was also invited and sang several songs with her.

She has chosen her career in showbiz over education, as she dropped out of school in 2011. But on April 13, 2019, Nikita Willy got Bachelor's degree in Law from Sekolah Tinggi Ilmu Hukum "Iblam".

Personal life 
Willy got engaged to Indra Priawan, the son of Chandra Suharto and Karlina Damiri, on July 25, 2020, and they got married on October 16, 2020. They married using Minangkabau custom from West Sumatra. Priawan's grandmother, Mutiara Siti Fatimah, is the owner of the Indonesian taxi company, Blue Bird Group, and he is the third generation of this company alongside his sibling and cousins.

Willy gave birth to her first son on April 7, 2022, who was named Issa Xander Djokosoetono at Cedars Sinai Hospital, Los Angeles, United States.

In 2008, she performed in Fajar Bustomi's Bestfriend?  in which Willy starred in the lead role.

She is also related to the Indonesian multitalented celebrity, Titi Handayani, who is married to Adrianto Djokosoetono, her husband's cousin.

In her second film in 2008, MBA (Married By Accident), Willy portrayed the character of Olivia (Ole).

Filmography

Web series

Television

Discography

Albums

Singles

Collaboration 
 "Can I stay" (2003) — Theme Song of Ratu Pelangi, sinetron Ratu Malu dan Jendral Kancil
 "Pantun Nasihat" (2004) — feat Sulton Max, Dika F. 
 "Doa Keselamatan" (2004) — feat Sulton Max, Dika F.
 "Doa di Waktu Pagi" (2004) — feat Sulton Max, Dika F.
 "Doa Ayah Bunda" (2004) —  feat Sulton Max, Novi, Dika F. 
 "Doa Sebelum dan Sesudah Makan" (2004) — feat Sulton Max, Novi, Dika F.
 "Mamaku" (2006) — feat Cindy Valerie
 "Jatuh Cinta Tak Ada Logika" (2015) — feat Aliando Syarief, Teuku Rassya, Calvin Jeremy, Agnez Mo 
 "Bahagia dengan Cinta" (2016) — feat Aliando Syarief, Teuku Rassya, Calvin Jeremy

Awards and nominations

See also 
Ladya Cheryl

References

External links 

1994 births
Indonesian actresses
Indonesian film actresses
21st-century Indonesian women singers
Indonesian pop singers
Living people
VJs (media personalities)
Minangkabau people
Indonesian female kickboxers
Indonesian female judoka
Indonesian female mixed martial artists
Indonesian Muslims